Bobekov is a Bulgarian surname. Notable people with the surname include:

 Radko Bobekov (1928–1993), Bulgarian chess master
 Stoyan Bobekov (born 1953), Bulgarian cyclist

See also
 Bobkov

Bulgarian-language surnames